Shijing Township  is a township-level division situated in Anqing, Anhui, China. The township has jurisdiction over 12 village committees. The township has building materials industries, brick, grain and oil processing plants and agricultural production includes crops such as rice, oilseeds, and tea.

See also
List of township-level divisions of Anhui

References

Township-level divisions of Anhui